This is a glossary of properties and concepts in symplectic geometry in mathematics. The terms listed here cover the occurrences of symplectic geometry both in topology as well as in algebraic geometry (over the complex numbers for definiteness). The glossary also includes notions from Hamiltonian geometry, Poisson geometry and geometric quantization.

In addition, this glossary also includes some concepts (e.g., virtual fundamental class) in intersection theory that appear in symplectic geometry as they do not naturally fit into other lists such as the glossary of algebraic geometry.

A

C

D

E

F

H

I

K

L

M

N

P

Q

S

T

V

Notes

References 

Kontsevich, M. Enumeration of rational curves via torus actions. Progr. Math. 129, Birkhauser, Boston, 1995.
Meinrenken's lecture notes on symplectic geometry

External links 
http://arxiv.org/pdf/1409.0837.pdf (tangentially related)

Symplectic geometry
Symplectic
Wikipedia glossaries using description lists